Cheikhna Ould Mohamed Laghdaf (died 11 September 2018) was a Mauritanian diplomat and politician. He was the Foreign Minister of Mauritania from 1962 until 1963 and again from 1978 to 1979.

Laghdaf died on 11 September 2018.

References

Date of birth unknown
Year of birth unknown
Place of birth unknown
Place of death unknown
Foreign ministers of Mauritania
Mauritanian diplomats
2018 deaths